The Acoma Curio Shop is a former souvenir shop located on historic U.S. Route 66 in San Fidel, New Mexico. The store was built in 1916 by Abdoo Fidel, a Lebanese immigrant, and was originally a general store. In 1937, Fidel began to sell Native American curios to tourists passing through San Fidel on Route 66. Fidel's shop only sold curios crafted at the Acoma Pueblo, separating him from most souvenir shops at the time, which generally sold replica souvenirs or curios made by multiple tribes. In 1941, Fidel closed the curio shop and began selling general goods again. The building now houses an art gallery called Gallery 66.

The building was added to the National Register of Historic Places on October 7, 2009.

See also

National Register of Historic Places listings in Cibola County, New Mexico

References

Buildings and structures in Cibola County, New Mexico
Commercial buildings completed in 1937
Commercial buildings on the National Register of Historic Places in New Mexico
Buildings and structures on U.S. Route 66
U.S. Route 66 in New Mexico
History of Cibola County, New Mexico
National Register of Historic Places in Cibola County, New Mexico
Native American history of New Mexico